"The Lucky One" is a song recorded by American country music singer Faith Hill.  It was released in February 2006 as the third single from her 2005 album Fireflies  The song was a Top 10 Country hit in 2006. It was co-written by Brad and Brett Warren (also known as The Warren Brothers), who also wrote Hill's 2007 single "Red Umbrella", and Jay Joyce.  Brett Warren also sings harmony vocals on this song.

Chart performance
"The Lucky One" debuted on the Country Top 40 in 2006. It was Hill's third single released from Fireflies, and her second single released from the album as a solo artist. "The Lucky One" peaked among the Top 10 at No. 5, her third Top 10 Country hit from the album.

"The Lucky One" was one of three other singles released after Hill's lead single, "Mississippi Girl" to reach the Top 10 on the Country charts.

Music video
"The Lucky One"'s music video shows Hill mainly performing with her band, singing on various stages, while also showing various clips of Hill laughing and talking backstage. It was directed by Chris Hicky.

Personnel
Compiled from liner notes.
 Greg Barnhill — background vocals
 Tom Bukovac — acoustic and electric guitars
 Paul Bushnell — bass guitar
 Vinnie Colaiuta — drums
 Dan Dugmore — steel guitar
 Paul Franklin — steel guitar
 Byron Gallimore — electric guitar
 Kenny Greenberg — electric mandolin
 Aubrey Haynie — mandolin
 Jay Joyce — acoustic and electric guitars
 Gene Miller — background vocals
 Jimmy Nichols — organ
 Darrell Scott — acoustic guitar, Weissenborn
 Javier Solis — percussion
 Crystal Taliefero — background vocals
 Brett Warren — background vocals

Chart performance

Year-end charts

References

2006 singles
2005 songs
Faith Hill songs
Songs written by the Warren Brothers
Song recordings produced by Byron Gallimore
Warner Records singles
Music videos directed by Chris Hicky
Songs written by Jay Joyce